The 1955 Challenge Desgrange-Colombo was the eighth edition of the Challenge Desgrange-Colombo. It included eleven races: all the races form the 1954 edition were retained with no additions. Stan Ockers won the individual championship while Belgium retained the nations championship.

Races

Final standings

Riders

Nations

References

 
Challenge Desgrange-Colombo
Challenge Desgrange-Colombo